Patricia Saldaña Natke (born 1964 in Chicago, Illinois) is an American architect, the founding partner and president of UrbanWorks, Ltd., a Chicago-based architecture, interiors, and urban planning firm.

Biography
Saldaña Natke is a founding partner of UrbanWorks, an award-winning architecture, planning, and interior design firm in Chicago. As president, she oversees design excellence and the firm’s vision. Her commitment to public service imbues the firm with a strong civic ethic. She has completed over 5,000 units of housing, six mixed-income developments, office and university projects, and over 65 public school renovations, additions, and new construction. 

Prior to founding UrbanWorks, Saldaña Natke worked in design positions for several Chicago architectural firms. She chaired the National AIA Diversity Committee for the American Institute of Architects and was a past president of Chicago Women in Architecture and the Illinois São Paulo, Brazil Partners of the Americas Chapter. She is currently on the board of the American Institute of Architects Chicago Chapter  and is a member of the Economic Club of Chicago, Arquitectos – the Society of Hispanic Architects, HACIA (Hispanic American Construction Industry Association), and the Concordia Place Advisory Council.

A graduate of the University of Illinois at Urbana Champaign, Saldaña Natke has served as adjunct professor at the University of Illinois at Chicago, a facilitator at Archeworks, and a part-time Professor at the Illinois Institute of Technology’s School of Architecture, and a lecturer at the School of the Art Institute of Chicago.

Saldaña Natke was listed in the “2014: 50 Chicago Designers” by Newcity, one of the five "Chicago's Emerging Grand Designers" by Crain’s Chicago Business, and was elevated to Fellow of the American Institute of Architects in 2018.

Projects
 Cabrini Green Development Zone Plan
 Old Cook County Hospital Adaptive Reuse
 "A Safe Haven Veterans Village''
 La Casa Student Housing 
 Big Bold Visionary Gary Green: Gary, Indiana, Master Plan
 Galewood Elementary School LEED for Schools – Silver Certification
 Pilsen Master Plan
 Veterans Memorial Charter School Campus – LEED for New Construction – Gold Certification
 “Design on the Edge: Chicago Architects Reimagine Neighborhoods”  - Pilsen Textile Incubator and Multi-Modal Transport, September 2011 - March 2012 at the Chicago Architecture Foundation 
 Office of Multicultural Student Affairs (OMSA) Building (University of Chicago)

Exhibitions

 Chicago Futures, Chicago Architecture Foundation, May 2016 – Present.
 ChiDesign, Chicago Architecture Foundation, October 2015.
 New Chicago Architecture, 332 S. Michigan, Chicago, November 2015.
 Forms of Imagination, The University of Chicago, November–December 2015.
 A.DOT: Architects. Doing Our Thing, The School of the Art Institute of Chicago, October 2015.
 Leaders of Design, Florida International University, February - March 2015.
 Women Building Change: Celebrating 40 Years of Chicago Women in Architecture, Chicago Architecture Foundation Lecture Hall (Chicago), June 12-December 2014.
 Take Me to the River: Building Chicago’s New Waterfront, Chicago Architecture Foundation Lecture Hall (Chicago), June–December 2013.

Awards and honors
 Fellow of the American Institute of Architects, 2018
 AIA Chicago Distinguished Building Award, Citation of Merit, A Safe Haven: Affordable Veterans Housing, 2017
 ALA Merit Award, ICE CADE: Center for Architecture, Design + Education, 2017
 AIA Illinois Mies Van Der Rohe Award, Associate Architect, Cermak Green Line Station, 2016
 American Architecture Award, Galewood Elementary School, 2016
 AIA Chicago Distinguished Building Award, Associate Architect, Cermak Green Line Station, 2015
 AIA Chicago Divine Detail Award, Associate Architect, Cermak Green Line Station Train Tube, 2015
 Chicago Architecture Foundation ChiDesign Competition, Shortlist, Ice Cade, 2015
 ALA Merit Award, Old Cook County Hospital Adaptive Reuse, 2015
 IES Illumination Award of Merit, Galewood Elementary School (with Primera Engineers, Lighting), 2015
 ALA Gold Medal Design Award, Textile Center, 2014
 ALA Gold Medal Design Award, Galewood Elementary School, 2013
 Chicago Building Congress Merit Award for Construction Under $15 Million, La Casa Student Housing, 2013
 Richard H. Driehaus Foundation Award for Architectural Excellence in Community Design, First Place, La Casa Student Housing, 2013
 ALA Merit Award, La Casa Student Housing, 2012
 AIA Chicago Small Project Honor Award, Automobile Container, 2011
 AIA Chicago Distinguished Building Award, Citation of Merit, Veterans Memorial Campus at Archer Heights, 2011
 AIA Chicago Regional & Urban Design Award, Citation of Merit, Big. Bold. Visionary. Groundplanes for Gary, 2011
 ALA Merit Award, Park Boulevard Mixed-Income Housing, 2011
 ALA Merit Award, Veterans Memorial Campus at Archer Heights, 2011
 Chicago Architecture Foundation, Patron of the Year Nomination, Buckingham Fountain Phase II, 2011
 Design Evanston Planning Award, Evanston Lakefront Masterplan, 2010
 Design Evanston Residential Award, Automobile Container, 2010
 Richard H. Driehaus Foundation Award for Architectural Excellence in Community Design, First Place, Veterans Memorial Campus at Archer Heights, 2010
 Chicago Building Congress Merit Award for Rehab Construction, First Place, Veterans Memorial Campus at Archer Heights, 2010
 AIA Chicago Urban Design Award for Excellence in Architecture, Honor Award, Chicago 2016 Olympic Master Plan, 2009
 Mayor Daley’s Landscape Award, First Place, Veterans Memorial Campus at Archer Heights, 2009

References

External links
 UrbanWorks official website
 The Chicago Architecture Foundation (October 7, 2014)."”. 
 The Chicago Architecture Foundation (April 17, 2013). “UrbanWorks’ Masterplan for Pilsen”. Lunch Talks @CAF Online. Retrieved March 6, 2015.
 The Richard H. Driehaus Foundation Award (February 13, 2013). “The Richard H. Driehaus Foundation Award for Architectural Excellence in Community Design, First Place”. Chicago Neighborhood Development Awards. Retrieved March 6, 2015.*

American women architects
People from Chicago
University of Illinois Urbana-Champaign alumni
Architects from Illinois
University of Illinois Chicago faculty
Illinois Institute of Technology faculty
21st-century American architects
1964 births
Living people
American women academics
21st-century American women